Mukteshwari River is a river located in Bangladesh originating in Jessore District. It is one of the seven main rivers of Jessore.

References

Rivers of Bangladesh
Rivers of Khulna Division